Samba is one of the six urban districts that make up the municipality of Luanda in Luanda Province, Angola.

Orientation
Samba is spatially one of the largest urban districts of Luanda with an area of 34.3 square kilometers and a population of 54,000. Samba is a district to the south of Ingombota along the coast of the Atlantic Ocean. The district is bordered to the north by Maianga, Quilamba Quiaxi to the east and the municipality of Viana, Angola also to the east.

Neighborhoods
Samba is composed of seven neighborhoods: Rocha Pinto, Prenda, Gameque, Morro Bento, Mabunda, Samba, and Corimba.

Luanda
Municipalities in Luanda
Populated places in Luanda Province